Omophron tessellatum, the mosaic round sand beetle, is a species of ground beetle in the family Carabidae found in North America. Its distribution includes the United States in states such as Arkansas, Virginia, Oklahoma, and Arizona; and in Canada in provinces such as Nova Scotia and Alberta. The species grows to lengths of 5.4 to 7 millimeters. Its habitat is flooded areas such as lake shores, river banks, ponds, pool edges, and beaches with sandy or clayish soil. It breeds in the spring from May to July.

References

Further reading

External links

 

Carabidae
Articles created by Qbugbot
Beetles described in 1823

Beetles of North America